The 2019 Badminton Asia Junior Championships was the 22nd edition of the Asia continental junior championships to crown the best U-19 badminton players across Asia. This tournament was held in Suzhou, China from 20 to 28 July 2019.

Tournament 
The 2019 Badminton Asia Junior Championships was organized by Chinese Badminton Association, with sanction from the Badminton Asia. This tournament consists of team and individual events. There were 14 teams competing in the mixed team event, which had been held from 20 to 23 July, while the individual events will be held from 24 to 28 July.

Venue 
This international tournament was held at Suzhou Olympic Sports Centre in Suzhou, China.

Medal summary

Medalists

Medal table

Team event

Seeds 
Seeds for team events were announced on 2 July.

 (final)
 (semi-finals)
 (champion)
 (semi-finals)
 (quarter-finals)
 (quarter-finals)
 (group stage)
 (quarter-finals)

Group stage

Group A

Group B

Group C

Group D

Knockout stage

References

External links
Team Event
Individual Event

 
Badminton Asia Junior Championships
Asia Junior Championships
Badminton tournaments in China
International sports competitions hosted by China
Badminton Asia Junior Championships
Badminton Asia Junior Championships
Badminton Asia Junior Championships